The Kuwait Cancer Control Center or KCCC (Arabic: مركز الكويت لمكافحة السرطان) is a comprehensive center dedicated to the purpose of providing Cancer Care across the State of Kuwait. KCCC has been serving the Kuwaiti cancer population since 1968. With over 600 highly qualified oncology staff, KCCC is a 200-bed hospital complex located in Shuwaikh. The center is made up of seven buildings, each specialized in a treatment area of cancer:
 Radiotherapy Building
 Hussain Makki Juma Center for Specialized Surgery
 Faisal Sultan Bin Essa Center for Radiodiagnosis and Radiotherapy
 Sheikha Badriya Al Ahmed Al Jaber Al Sabah Center for Oncology and Stem Cell Transfusion
 Palliative Care Center
 Yacoub Behbehani Laboratory Building & Bone Marrow Transplantation Center
 NBK Pediatric Hospital

References 

http://wikimapia.org/12460513/KCCC-Kuwait-Cancer-Control-Center

https://web.archive.org/web/20130317013716/http://www.aperio.com/sites/default/files/articles/0712_Kuwait.pdf
http://www.ilshayeb.com/?p=7638

https://web.archive.org/web/20131229152936/http://www.bndq8.com/kuwaitcancercontrolcenter/

Medical and health organizations based in Kuwait
Hospitals in Kuwait
Hospitals established in 1968
1968 establishments in Kuwait